was a Japanese writer, social critic and public figure. He is the author of several best-selling books in Japan. His autobiography Toppamono sold 600,000 copies and has since been translated into English.

In 1985, Miyazaki was named by the Tokyo police as the prime suspect in the Glico Morinaga case, a 17-month saga of kidnapping and corporate extortion. He was later cleared.

Translated works

See also
 Shinichiro Kurimoto

References

External links
 Official website 
 Press Conference at Foreign Correspondents' Club Japan, Tokyo

1945 births
2022 deaths
Japanese writers
People from Kyoto Prefecture
Writers from Kyoto Prefecture
People from Kyoto
Writers from Kyoto
Waseda University alumni
Yakuza members